Mark Armando Aguiar (born 1966) is an American economist, focusing in macroeconomics and international economics, currently the Walker Professor of Economics and International Finance at Princeton University.

Career 
Aguiar graduated from Brown University with honors in history and Chinese in 1988 and worked as a Foreign Service officer at the Department of State in 1989–1995. He completed his PhD in economics from the Massachusetts Institute of Technology in 1999 where his advisors were Ricardo J. Caballero and Daron Acemoglu.

Aguiar was as an assistant professor at the University of Chicago Graduate School of Business between 1999 and 2004, a senior economist at the Federal Reserve Bank of Boston from 2004 to 2006, and an associate professor of economics at the University of Rochester from 2006 to 2011. He joined Princeton University as a Professor of Economics in 2011.

Aguiar worked from 2014 to 2017 as a co-editor of the American Economic Review, where he also previously held a spot on the board of editors and reviewed submissions relating to macroeconomics. Additionally, is a research associate at the National Bureau of Economic Research. Aguiar has been a member of the advisory board of the Carnegie-NYU-Rochester Conference on Public Policy since 2010.

References

1966 births
Living people
Princeton University faculty
21st-century American economists
MIT School of Humanities, Arts, and Social Sciences alumni
Brown University alumni
Fellows of the Econometric Society